São Tomé and Príncipe is a Portuguese-speaking island nation in the Gulf of Guinea, off the western equatorial coast of Central Africa.

Since the 19th century, the economy of São Tomé and Príncipe has been based on plantation agriculture. At the time of independence, Portuguese-owned plantations occupied 90% of the cultivated area. After independence, control of these plantations passed to various state-owned agricultural enterprises. The main crop on São Tomé is cocoa, representing about 95% of agricultural exports. Other export crops include copra, palm kernels, and coffee.

Notable firms 
This list includes notable companies with primary headquarters located in the country. The industry and sector follow the Industry Classification Benchmark taxonomy. Organizations which have ceased operations are included and noted as defunct.

See also
 List of airlines of São Tomé and Príncipe
 List of banks in São Tomé and Príncipe

References

 
Sao Tome e Principe